Lithospermum purpurocaeruleum (syn. Buglossoides purpurocaerulea), the purple gromwell, is a herbaceous perennial rhizomatous plant of the genus Lithospermum, belonging to the family Boraginaceae.

Etymology
The Latin name of the species, means 'purple and blue', referring to the changing colour of the flowers with the progress of flowering.

Description
The stem is hairy, erect and unbranched. Leaves are dark green and lanceolate to narrow elliptic, with a prominent midrib on the underside. The blossoms are purple-reddish, then the color of the flowers turns into a deep blue. The flowering period extends from April to June. They are very hard (hence the genus synonym Lithospermum, meaning "stone seed" for the hardness of these capsules).

Distribution
This species is widespread in British Isles, in central Europe up to South Russia and in Mediterranean countries from Spain to the eastern Turkey.

Habitat
Lithospermum purpurocaeruleum is typically found in dry and warm forests with sparse deciduous vegetation, in the meadows on the edge of the wood, in hedgerows and scrublands.

References

 Pignatti S. - Flora d'Italia – Edagricole – 1982, Vol. II, pag. 398
 Tutin, T.G. et al. - Flora Europaea, second edition - 1993

External links

purpurocaeruleum
Plants described in 1753
Taxa named by Carl Linnaeus
Plant dyes
Blue flowers